is a Japanese gymnast. He has won two Olympic medals in the men's artistic team all-around – silver in 2012 (London) and gold in 2016 (Rio de Janeiro).

Personal life 
Tanaka was born on November 29, 1989 in Wakayama. His elder brother is Kazuhito Tanaka and an elder sister is Rie Tanaka.

Career 
Tanaka won a silver medal at the 2012 Summer Olympics in the men's artistic team all-around.

At the 2013 Summer Universiade in Kazan, Tanaka won silver on the horizontal bar and the team bronze medal (with Hiroki Ishikawa, Shogo Nonomura, Ryohei Kato and Chihiro Yoshioka). He won the team gold medal at the 2015 World Championships and at the 2016 Summer Olympics.

References

External links
 
 
 

Japanese male artistic gymnasts
1989 births
Living people
Olympic gymnasts of Japan
Gymnasts at the 2012 Summer Olympics
Gymnasts at the 2016 Summer Olympics
Olympic gold medalists for Japan
Olympic silver medalists for Japan
Olympic medalists in gymnastics
Medalists at the 2012 Summer Olympics
Medalists at the 2016 Summer Olympics
Medalists at the World Artistic Gymnastics Championships
Universiade medalists in gymnastics
People from Wakayama Prefecture
Universiade silver medalists for Japan
Universiade bronze medalists for Japan
Medalists at the 2013 Summer Universiade
21st-century Japanese people